Ngoy Lusungu Serge, better known as Serge Le Griot, is a Congolese musician, poet, songwriter and blogger from North Kivu province.

Biography

Childhood and education: 1995–2013
Ngoy Lusungu Serge, known as "Serge Le Griot", was born on 12 February 1995 in the city of Goma (North Kivu), in the east of the Democratic Republic of the Congo. Passionate about modern poetry from an early age, he launched into the theater. After a few years in the troupe "Echos des plumes" of the cultural center of Goma, in 2014 launched into slam to give a voice to these texts long hidden in notebooks. Two years later, he left his hometown to settle in the former Burundian capital, the city of Bujumbura, for study reasons.

Debut with Jewe Slam: 2016–present 
Serge Le Griot met many artists while he was doing his bachelor in civil engineering at the Bujumbura Light University. He got to know the Chadian slammer Croque-mort, the actor and director Kader and the French slammers Rouda and Lyor including Rouda who inspired him to create, with fourteen other slammers from the region, the collective Jewe Slam. In 2018, the collective participated for the first time in the African Cup of slam-poetry and it was consecrated ambassador of the championship in the African region of the Great Lakes.

Discography 
In 2018, Serge Le Griot released his very first Slam album of 6 tracks with a new style called "Afroslamusic". He thus becomes the first slam artist from Central Africa to release an album and a source of inspiration for several others which will follow. His second album entitled "Shauku" is scheduled for this year 2020.

Album
 2020 : Shauku
 Rumoge
 Nous contre nous
 Monsieur
 Inzoga
 Shauku
 2018 : Griot
 Griot
 Slam Afrique
 Danse d'amour
 amour presidentiel
 Quitter un poet
 Tujenge Amahoro

Honors
 2016 : Winner of the young ambassadors for peace contest named « 1000 Expressions de paix »

References 

Category:Bujumbura Light University alumni

1995 births
Living people
People from Goma
21st-century Democratic Republic of the Congo male singers
Democratic Republic of the Congo songwriters
Democratic Republic of the Congo musicians